Melbourne Little Theatre was a theatre company in Melbourne, Australia, founded by Brett Randall and Hal Percy in 1931.  

Randall and Percy staged their first production, Miles Malleson's The Fanatics, at the central hall of His Majesty's Theatre in December 1931. In 1934 they purchased a disused church, "St Chad's" in Martin Street, South Yarra and, renamed "The Little Theatre", which served as their home for nearly 20 years.

It built its own theatre in South Yarra in the 1950s and evolved into the professional St Martin's Theatre Company, before closing in 1974.

Irene Mitchell was director and producer for many of its productions.

Its theatre later became the St Martins Youth Arts Centre.

References

Theatre companies in Australia
Theatre in Melbourne